Anthony DeStefano (born 1965) is an American author of Christian books for adults and children.

DeStefano’s first book, A Travel Guide to Heaven, was published in 18 countries. His second book, Ten Prayers God Always Says Yes To, was endorsed by the National Day of Prayer Task Force.

Writing in World magazine, Gene Edward Veith said: "DeStefano is a Roman Catholic…but he tries to stick to what all Christians would affirm, with nearly as many evangelical sources in his bibliography as Catholic ones." Regarding DeStefano's children's books, Maura Grunlund, writing in the Staten Island Advance, said: "Weak characters who find strength are a favorite theme of the author, who explored the concept in his first children's book, Little Star."

In 2015, DeStefano hosted a 5-part miniseries called: A Travel Guide to Heaven, based on his book of that title, on the Eternal Word Television Network (EWTN).

Books
A Travel Guide to Heaven, Doubleday, 2003. 
Ten Prayers God Always Says Yes To: Divine Answers to Life’s Most Difficult Problems, Image, 2007. 
Angels All Around Us: A Sightseeing Guide to the Invisible World, Image, 2011. 
A Travel Guide to Life: Transforming Yourself from Head to Soul, Faith Words, 2014. 
Inside the Atheist Mind: Unmasking the Religion of Those Who Say There is No God, Thomas Nelson, 2019. 
Hell: A Guide, Thomas Nelson, 2020.  
Little Star, Harvest House, 2013. 
This Little Prayer of Mine, Harvest House, 2014. 
A Travel Guide to Heaven for Kids, Harvest House, 2013. 
The Sheep That No One Could Find, Harvest House, 2014. 
The Puppy That No One Wanted, Servant Books, 2015. 
Roxy the Ritzy Camel, Harvest House, 2016. 
The Miracle of the Bread, the Fish and the Boy, Harvest House, 2018. 
The Seed Who Was Afraid to Be Planted, Sophia Institute Press, 2019. 
The Grumpy Old Ox, Sophia Institute Press, 2020. 
Our Lady’s Wardrobe, Sophia Institute Press, 2020. 
Our Lady’s Picture Book, Sophia Institute Press, 2021. 
I Just Can’t Take it Anymore! Encouragement When Life Gets You Down, Harvest House, 2012. 
Ok I Admit it, I’m Afraid: Finding the Courage to Overcome Life’s Problems, Harvest House, 2015. 
The Love Book: A Simple Guide to the Most Abused, Confused, and Misused Word in the English Language, Harvest House, 2016. 
Why Am I Here Anyway? The Simple Answer to Life’s Biggest Question, Harvest House, 2017. 
All This and Heaven Too! Thanking God for the Gift of Life, Harvest House, 2019.

References

External links

Official website

1965 births
Living people
American children's writers
American Roman Catholics
People of the Civil Air Patrol
St. John's University (New York City) alumni